The Vivacious gerbil (Gerbillus vivax) is a synonym for two species:
Gerbillus nanus - Balochistan gerbil, dwarf gerbil
Gerbillus amoenus - pleasant gerbil

Gerbils
Mammals of Africa
Animal common name disambiguation pages